East Ogan Komering Ulu Regency is a regency of South Sumatra Province, Indonesia. It covers an area of 3,370 km2 and had a population of 609,982 at the 2010 Census and 649,853 at the 2020 Census. The regency seat is the town of Martapura. It borders Ogan Ilir Regency to the north, Ogan Komering Ulu Regency to the west, Ogan Komering Ilir Regency in the east and Lampung Province and South Ogan Komering Ulu Regency in the south.

Administrative districts 

This Regency is administratively composed of twenty districts (kecamatan), comprising 191 villages. Their areas (in km2) and their 2010 and 2020 Census populations are listed below, together with the locations at the district administrative centres:

|}

Economy
The regency is one of the major rice producing areas of South Sumatra, mainly concentrated in the Belitang District, Buay Madang District, Cempaka District and Martapura Districts with a large-scale irrigation scheme covering some 120,000 hectares. Other crops include rubber, coffee, black pepper, coconut, palm oil and fruits such as orange, durian, duku, rambutan and banana.

Notable people

Former Constitutional Court judge Ahmad Natabaya was born in the regency in the village of Cempaka.

References

Regencies of South Sumatra